This is a list of foreign ministers in 2000.

Africa
 Algeria -
 Youcef Yousfi (1999-2000)
 Abdelaziz Belkhadem (2000-2005)
 Angola - João Bernardo de Miranda (1999-2008)
 Benin - Antoine Idji Kolawolé (1998-2003)
 Botswana - Mompati Merafhe (1994-2008)
 Burkina Faso - Youssouf Ouedraogo (1999-2007)
 Burundi -  Severin Ntahomvukiye (1998-2001)
 Cameroon - Augustin Kontchou Kouomegni (1997-2001)
 Cape Verde -
 José Luís de Jesus (1998-2000)
 Rui Alberto de Figueiredo Soares (2000-2001)
 Central African Republic - Marcel Metefara (1999-2001)
 Chad - Mahamat Saleh Annadif (1997-2003)
 Comoros - Mohamed El-Amine Souef (1999-2002)
 Republic of Congo - Rodolphe Adada (1997-2007)
 Democratic Republic of Congo -
 Abdoulaye Yerodia Ndombasi (1999-2000)
 Léonard She Okitundu (2000-2003)
 Côte d'Ivoire -
 Amara Essy (1990-2000)
 Christophe Mboua (2000)
 Charles Gomis (2000)
 Abou Drahamane Sangare (2000-2003)
 Djibouti - Ali Abdi Farah (1999-2005)
 Egypt - Amr Moussa (1991-2001)
 Equatorial Guinea - Santiago Nsobeya Efuman (1999-2003)
 Eritrea -
 Haile Woldetensae (1997-2000)
 Ali Said Abdella (2000-2005)
 Ethiopia - Seyoum Mesfin (1991-2010)
 Gabon - Jean Ping (1999-2008)
 The Gambia - Momodou Lamin Sedat Jobe (1998-2001)
 Ghana - Victor Gbeho (1997-2001)
 Guinea -
 Zainoul Abidine Sanoussy (1999-2000)
 Mahawa Bangoura (2000-2002)
 Guinea-Bissau -
 José Pereira Baptista (1999-2000)
 Yaya Diallo (2000-2001)
 Kenya - Bonaya Godana (1998-2001)
 Kyrgyzstan - Muratbek Imanaliyev (1997-2002)
 Lesotho - Tom Thabane (1998-2002)
 Liberia - Monie Captan (1996-2003)
 Libya -
 Umar Mustafa al-Muntasir (1992-2000)
 Abdel Rahman Shalgham (2000-2009)
 Madagascar - Lila Ratsifandrihamanana (1998-2002)
 Malawi -
 Brown Mpinganjira (1999-2000)
 Lilian Patel (2000-2004)
 Mali - Modibo Sidibe (1997-2002)
 Mauritania - Ahmed Ould Sid'Ahmed (1998-2001)
 Mauritius -
 Rajkeswur Purryag (1997-2000)
 Anil Gayan (2000-2003)
 Morocco - Mohamed Benaissa (1999-2007)
 Western Sahara - Mohamed Salem Ould Salek (1998–2023)
 Mozambique - Leonardo Simão (1994-2005)
 Namibia - Theo-Ben Gurirab (1990-2002)
 Niger -
 Aïchatou Mindaoudou (1999-2000)
 Nassirou Sabo (2000-2001)
 Nigeria - Sule Lamido (1999-2003)
 Rwanda -
 Augustin Iyamuremye (1999-2000)
 André Bumaya (2000-2002)
 São Tomé and Príncipe -
 Paulo Jorge Espirito Santo (1999-2000)
 Joaquim Rafael Branco (2000-2001)
 Senegal -
 Jacques Baudin (1998-2000)
 Cheikh Tidiane Gadio (2000-2009)
 Seychelles - Jérémie Bonnelame (1997-2005)
 Sierra Leone - Sama Banya (1998-2001)
 Somalia - Ismail Mahmud Hurre (2000-2002)
 Somaliland - Mahmud Salah Nur (1997-2001)
 South Africa - Nkosazana Dlamini-Zuma (1999-2009)
 Sudan - Mustafa Osman Ismail (1998-2005)
 Swaziland - Albert Nhlanhla Shabangu (1998-2001)
 Tanzania - Jakaya Kikwete (1995-2006)
 Togo -
 Joseph Kokou Koffigoh (1998-2000)
 Koffi Panou (2000-2002)
 Tunisia - Habib Ben Yahia (1999-2004)
 Uganda - Eriya Kategaya (1996-2001)
 Zambia - Keli Walubita (1997-2002)
 Zimbabwe - Stan Mudenge (1995-2005)

Asia
 Afghanistan - Wakil Ahmed Muttawakil (1999-2001)
 Armenia - Vartan Oskanian (1998-2008)
 Azerbaijan - Vilayat Guliyev (1999-2004)
 Nagorno-Karabakh - Naira Melkumyan (1997-2002)
 Bahrain - Sheikh Muhammad ibn Mubarak ibn Hamad Al Khalifah (1971-2005)
 Bangladesh - Abdus Samad Azad (1996-2001)
 Bhutan - Jigme Thinley (1998-2003)
 Brunei - Pengiran Muda Mohamed Bolkiah (1984–2015)
 Cambodia - Hor Namhong (1998–2016)
 China - Tang Jiaxuan (1998-2003)
 East Timor - José Ramos-Horta (2000-2006)
 Georgia - Irakli Menagarishvili (1995-2003)
 Abkhazia - Sergei Shamba (1997-2004)
 South Ossetia - Murat Dzhioyev (1998-2012)
 India - Jaswant Singh (1998-2002)
 Indonesia - Alwi Shihab (1999-2001)
 Iran - Kamal Kharazi (1997-2005)
 Iraq - Muhammad Saeed al-Sahhaf (1992-2001)
 Israel -
 David Levy (1999-2000)
 Ehud Barak (acting) (2000)
 Shlomo Ben-Ami (2000-2001)
 Japan - Yōhei Kōno (1999-2001)
 Jordan - Abdul Ilah Khatib (1998-2002)
 Kazakhstan - Erlan Idrisov (1999-2002)
 North Korea - Paek Nam-sun (1998-2007)
 South Korea -
 Hong Soon-young (1998-2000)
 Yi Jeong-bin (2000-2001)
 Kuwait - Sheikh Sabah Al-Ahmad Al-Jaber Al-Sabah (1978-2003)
 Kyrgyzstan - Muratbek Imanaliyev (1997-2002)
 Laos - Somsavat Lengsavad (1993-2006)
 Lebanon -
 Selim al-Hoss (1998-2000)
 Mahmoud Hammoud (2000-2003)
 Malaysia - Syed Hamid Albar (1999-2008)
 Maldives - Fathulla Jameel (1978-2005)
 Mongolia -
 Nyam-Osoryn Tuyaa (1998-2000)
 Luvsangiin Erdenechuluun (2000-2004)
 Myanmar - Win Aung (1998-2004)
 Nepal -
 Ram Sharan Mahat (1999-2000)
 Chakra Bastola (2000-2001)
 Oman - Yusuf bin Alawi bin Abdullah (1982–2020)
 Pakistan - Abdul Sattar (1999-2002)
 Philippines - Domingo Siazon, Jr. (1995-2001)
 Qatar - Sheikh Hamad bin Jassim bin Jaber Al Thani (1992–2013)
 Saudi Arabia - Prince Saud bin Faisal bin Abdulaziz Al Saud (1975–2015)
 Singapore - S. Jayakumar (1994-2004)
 Sri Lanka - Lakshman Kadirgamar (1994-2001)
 Syria - Farouk al-Sharaa (1984-2006)
 Taiwan -
 Chen Chien-jen (1999-2000)
 Tien Hung-mao (2000-2002)
 Tajikistan - Talbak Nazarov (1994-2006)
 Thailand - Surin Pitsuwan (1997-2001)
 Turkey - İsmail Cem (1997-2002)
 Turkmenistan -
 Boris Şyhmyradow (1995-2000)
 Batyr Berdiýew (2000-2001)
 United Arab Emirates - Rashid Abdullah Al Nuaimi (1980-2006)
 Uzbekistan - Abdulaziz Komilov (1994-2003)
 Vietnam -
 Nguyễn Mạnh Cầm (1991-2000)
 Nguyễn Dy Niên (2000-2006)
 Yemen - Abdul Qadir Bajamal (1998-2001)

Australia and Oceania
 Australia - Alexander Downer (1996-2007)
 Fiji -
 Tupeni Baba (1999-2000)
 Kaliopate Tavola (2000-2006)
 French Polynesia - Gaston Flosse (2000-2004)
 Kiribati -  Teburoro Tito (1994-2003)
 Marshall Islands -
 Phillip H. Muller (1994-2000)
 Alvin Jacklick (2000-2001)
 Micronesia -
 Epel K. Ilon (1997-2000)
 Ieske K. Iehsi (2000-2003)
 Nauru -
 René Harris (1999-2000)
 Bernard Dowiyogo (2000-2001)
 New Zealand - Phil Goff (1999-2005)
 Cook Islands - Robert Woonton (1999-2004)
 Niue - Sani Lakatani (1999-2002)
 Palau - Sabino Anastacio (1997-2000)
 Papua New Guinea -
 Sir John Kaputin (1999-2000)
 Sir Michael Somare (2000)
 Bart Philemon (2000-2001)
 Samoa - Tuilaepa Sailele Malielegaoi (1998–2021)
 Solomon Islands -
 Patterson Oti (1997-2000)
 Danny Philip (2000-2001)
 Tonga - Prince 'Ulukalala Lavaka Ata (1998-2004)
 Tuvalu -
 Ionatana Ionatana (1999-2000)
 Lagitupu Tuilimu (2000-2001)
 Vanuatu - Serge Vohor (1999-2001)

Europe
 Albania - Paskal Milo (1997-2001)
 Andorra - Albert Pintat (1997-2001)
 Austria -
 Wolfgang Schüssel (1995-2000)
 Benita Ferrero-Waldner (2000-2004)
 Belarus -
 Ural Latypov (1998-2000)
 Mikhail Khvostov (2000-2003)
 Belgium - Louis Michel (1999-2004)
 Brussels-Capital Region -
 Annemie Neyts-Uyttebroeck (1999-2000)
 Guy Vanhengel (2000-2009)
 Flanders - Patrick Dewael (1999-2001)
 Bosnia and Herzegovina - Jadranko Prlić (1996-2001)
 Bulgaria - Nadezhda Mihailova (1997-2001)
 Croatia -
 Mate Granić (1993-2000)
 Tonino Picula (2000-2003)
 Cyprus - Ioannis Kasoulidis (1997-2003)
 Northern Cyprus - Tahsin Ertuğruloğlu (1998-2004)
 Czech Republic - Jan Kavan (1998-2002)
 Denmark -
 Niels Helveg Petersen (1993-2000)
 Mogens Lykketoft (2000-2001)
 Estonia - Toomas Hendrik Ilves (1999-2002)
 Finland -
 Tarja Halonen (1995-2000)
 Erkki Tuomioja (2000-2007)
 France - Hubert Védrine (1997-2002)
 Germany - Joschka Fischer (1998-2005)
 Greece - George Papandreou (1999-2004)
 Hungary - János Martonyi (1998-2002)
 Iceland - Halldór Ásgrímsson (1995-2004)
 Ireland -
 David Andrews (1997-2000)
 Brian Cowen (2000-2004)
 Italy - Lamberto Dini (1996-2001)
 Latvia - Indulis Bērziņš (1999-2002)
 Liechtenstein - Andrea Willi (1993-2001)
 Lithuania -
 Algirdas Saudargas (1996-2000)
 Antanas Valionis (2000-2006)
 Luxembourg - Lydie Polfer (1999-2004)
 Macedonia -
 Aleksandar Dimitrov (1998-2000)
 Srgjan Kerim (2000-2001)
 Malta -  Joe Borg (1999-2004)
 Moldova -
 Nicolae Tăbăcaru (1997-2000)
 Nicolae Cernomaz (2000-2001)
 Transnistria - Valeriy Litskai (2000-2008)
 Netherlands - Jozias van Aartsen (1998-2002)
 Norway -
 Knut Vollebæk (1997-2000)
 Thorbjørn Jagland (2000-2001)
 Poland -
 Bronisław Geremek (1997-2000)
 Władysław Bartoszewski (2000-2001)
 Portugal - Jaime Gama (1995-2002)
 Romania -
 Petre Roman (1999-2000)
 Mircea Geoană (2000-2004)
 Russia - Igor Ivanov (1998-2004)
 San Marino - Gabriele Gatti (1986-2002)
 Slovakia - Eduard Kukan (1998-2006)
 Slovenia -
 Boris Frlec (1997-2000)
 Dimitrij Rupel (2000)
 Lojze Peterle (2000)
 Dimitrij Rupel (2000-2004)
 Spain -
 Abel Matutes (1996-2000)
 Josep Piqué (2000-2002)
 Sweden - Anna Lindh (1998-2003)
 Switzerland - Joseph Deiss (1999-2002)
 Ukraine -
 Borys Tarasyuk (1998-2000)
 Anatoliy Zlenko (2000-2003)
 United Kingdom - Robin Cook (1997-2001)
 Scotland - Jack McConnell (2000-2001)
 Vatican City - Archbishop Jean-Louis Tauran (1990-2003)
 Yugoslavia -
 Živadin Jovanović (1998-2000)
 Zoran Novaković (acting) (2000)
 Goran Svilanović (2000-2004)
 Montenegro -
 Branko Perović (1997-2000)
 Branko Lukovac (2000-2002)

North America and the Caribbean
 Antigua and Barbuda - Lester Bird (1991-2004)
 The Bahamas - Janet Bostwick (1994-2002)
 Barbados - Billie Miller (1994-2008)
 Belize - Said Musa (1998-2002)
 Canada -
 Lloyd Axworthy (1996-2000)
 John Manley (2000-2002)
 Quebec - Louise Beaudoin (1998-2003)
 Costa Rica - Roberto Rojas López (1998-2002)
 Cuba - Felipe Pérez Roque (1999-2009)
 Dominica -
 Norris Charles (1998-2000)
 Rosie Douglas (2000)
 Pierre Charles (2000-2001)
 Dominican Republic -
 Eduardo Latorre Rodríguez (1996-2000)
 Hugo Tolentino Dipp (2000-2003)
 El Salvador - María Eugenia Brizuela de Ávila (1999-2004)
 Grenada -
 Mark Isaac (1999-2000)
 Elvin Nimrod (2000-2008)
 Guatemala -
 Eduardo Stein (1996-2000)
 Gabriel Orellana Rojas (2000-2002)
 Haiti - Fritz Longchamp (1995-2001)
 Honduras - Roberto Flores Bermúdez (1999-2002)
 Jamaica -
 Seymour Mullings (1995-2000)
 Paul Robertson (2000-2001)
 Mexico -
 Rosario Green (1998-2000)
 Jorge Castañeda Gutman (2000-2003)
 Nicaragua -
 Eduardo Montealegre (1998-2000)
 José Adán Guerra Pastora (2000)
 Francisco Aguirre Sacasa (2000-2002)
 Panama - José Miguel Alemán Healy (1999-2003)
 Puerto Rico – Angel Morey (1999–2001)
 Saint Kitts and Nevis -
 Denzil Douglas (1995-2000)
 Sam Condor (2000-2001)
 Saint Lucia - George Odlum (1997-2001)
 Saint Vincent and the Grenadines - Allan Cruickshank (1998-2001)
 Trinidad and Tobago -
 Ralph Maraj (1995-2000)
 Mervyn Assam (2000-2001)
 United States - Madeleine Albright (1997-2001)

South America
 Argentina - Adalberto Rodríguez Giavarini (1999-2001)
 Bolivia - Javier Murillo de la Rocha (1997-2001)
 Brazil - Luiz Felipe Palmeira Lampreia (1995-2001)
 Chile -
 Juan Gabriel Valdés (1999-2000)
 Soledad Alvear (2000-2004)
 Colombia - Guillermo Fernández de Soto (1998-2002)
 Ecuador -
 Benjamín Ortiz Brennan (1999-2000)
 Heinz Moeller Freile (2000-2003)
 Guyana - Clement Rohee (1992-2001)
 Paraguay -
 José Félix Fernández Estigarribia (1999-2000)
 Juan Esteban Aguirre Martínez (2000-2001)
 Peru -
 Fernando de Trazegnies (1998-2000)
 Javier Pérez de Cuéllar (2000-2001)
 Suriname -
 Errol Snijders (1997-2000)
 Marie Levens (2000-2005)
 Uruguay - Didier Opertti (1998-2005)
 Venezuela - José Vicente Rangel (1999-2001)

2000 in international relations
Foreign ministers
2000